Ericameria discoidea, commonly known as whitestem goldenbush or sharp-scale goldenweed is a species of flowering shrub in the family Asteraceae. This plant is native to the western United States from California, Oregon, Nevada, Utah, Colorado, Idaho, and Montana.

Ericameria discoidea grows in clumpy thickets on rocky slopes. It is a small shrub reaching a maximum height of 40 centimeters (16 inches). It has many erect branches covered in a foliage of oval-shaped leaves coated in dense white woolly fibers and tiny stalked resin glands. Atop each short branch is an inflorescence of many flower heads, each packed with sometimes as many as 70 disc florets that bloom in golden yellow and wilt to a rusty orange. There are no ray florets.

References

External links
Jepson Manual Treatment
United States Department of Agriculture Plants Profile
Calphotos Photo gallery, University of California

discoidea
Flora of the Western United States
Flora of California
Flora of the Great Basin
Flora of the Sierra Nevada (United States)
Plants described in 1840
Taxa named by Thomas Nuttall
Flora without expected TNC conservation status